James Murray VC (February 1859 – 19 July 1942) was an Irish recipient of the Victoria Cross, the highest and most prestigious award for gallantry in the face of the enemy that can be awarded to British and Commonwealth forces.

Murray was born in St Michael's Parish, Cork City, Ireland. He was approximately 21 years old, and a Lance-Corporal in the 2nd Battalion, The Connaught Rangers, British Army during the First Boer War when the following deed took place for which he was awarded the VC. On 16 January 1881 at Elandsfontein, near Pretoria, South Africa, Lance-Corporal Murray and John Danaher, a trooper of Nourse's Horse, advanced for 500 yards under heavy fire from a party of about 60 of the enemy and brought out of action a private who had been severely wounded.

He died in Dublin on 19 July 1942. His Victoria Cross is displayed at the National Army Museum, Chelsea, England.

References

Listed in order of publication year 
The Register of the Victoria Cross (1981, 1988 and 1997)

Ireland's VCs  (Dept of Economic Development, 1995)
Monuments to Courage (David Harvey, 1999)
Irish Winners of the Victoria Cross (Richard Doherty & David Truesdale, 2000)

External links
Location of grave and VC medal (Dublin)

1859 births
1942 deaths
19th-century Irish people
Irish soldiers in the British Army
Connaught Rangers soldiers
Irish recipients of the Victoria Cross
British military personnel of the First Boer War
Burials at Glasnevin Cemetery
People from Cork (city)
First Boer War recipients of the Victoria Cross
British Army recipients of the Victoria Cross